Kashif Abbasi (Punjabi) is a Pakistani journalist, television talk show host and anchorperson based in Islamabad. He hosts the current political talk show Off the Record on the news channel ARY News.

Personal life 
His mother, Shahnaz Abbasi, passed away in 2020. In November 2011, Abbasi announced his marriage to Dunya News journalist Meher Bukhari. In June 2012, his wife became involved in a mediagate scandal involving property tycoon Malik Riaz.

Criticism 

In January 2020, Pakistan Electronic Media Regulatory Authority (PEMRA) banned the broadcast of Abbasi's programme Off the Record on ARY News for 60 days, following Faisal Vawda's appearance on his show alongside Qamar Zaman Kaira and Senator Muhammad Javed Abbasi.

See also
Meher Bukhari
Waseem Badami

References

Living people
Pakistani male journalists
Pakistani television talk show hosts
People from Islamabad
Punjabi people
1974 births
ARY News newsreaders and journalists